Howard McGraner (September 11, 1889 – October 22, 1952) was a pitcher in Major League Baseball. He played for the Cincinnati Reds.

References

External links

1889 births
1952 deaths
Major League Baseball pitchers
Cincinnati Reds players
Baseball players from Ohio
Chillicothe Infants players
San Antonio Bronchos players
Montreal Royals players
Charleston Senators players
Huntington Babes players
Maysville Angels players
Louisville Colonels (minor league) players
Joplin Miners players
Sioux City Indians players
Syracuse Stars (minor league baseball) players
Columbus Senators players
People from Athens County, Ohio